Love the Beast is a 2009 documentary film directed by Eric Bana, and featuring Bana, Jay Leno, Jeremy Clarkson, and Phil McGraw. It was listed as one of the best automotive documentaries by The News Wheel in 2015.

Synopsis

The film documents the 25-year history of Eric Bana's first car, a 1974 Ford XB Falcon Hardtop that he purchased at the age of fifteen for A$1100. In this film, Eric explores the central role that fixing and racing this car has played in his life and the lives of his friends. He describes it as being, "like a campfire for me and my mates". Celebrities Jay Leno, Dr. Phil and Jeremy Clarkson offer opinions on the emotional attachments that some people form with automobiles.

Box office
Love The Beast grossed $777,351 at the box office in Australia.

See also
 Cinema of Australia
 Targa Tasmania

References

External links
 
 

2009 films
2009 documentary films
Documentary films about automobiles
Australian auto racing films
2000s English-language films
Australian sports documentary films